The 2015 Northern European Gymnastics Championships was an artistic gymnastics competition held in the city of Limerick in the mid-west of the  Republic of Ireland. The event was held between the 18th and 20 September at the University of Limerick.

Schedule 

Saturday 18 September 2015 (Team and Individual All-Around competition)
9:10am – 12:25pm Subdivision 1: WAG - Iceland, Norway, Isle of Man, Faroe Islands, Scotland. MAG - Norway, Isle of Man, Wales, Faroe Islands, Finland.
1:45pm – 6:10pm Subdivision 2: WAG - Wales, Ireland, Denmark, Finland. MAG - Denmark, Sweden, Iceland, Ireland.
6:20pm: Medal Presentations

Sunday 19 September 2015 (Men's and Women's Individual Apparatus Finals)
10:25am – 10:54am: MAG Floor Exercise
10:54am – 11:23am: MAG Pommel Horse and WAG Vault
11:23am – 11:52am: MAG Rings and WAG Uneven Bars
12:50am– 1:19pm: MAG Vault
1:19pm – 1:48pm: MAG Parallel Bars and WAG Balance Beam
1:48pm – 2:17pm: MAG High Bar and WAG Floor Exercise
2:30pm: Medal Presentations

Medalists

References 

Northern European Gymnastics Championships
2015 in gymnastics
2015 in Irish sport
September 2015 sports events in Europe